Warren High School is a public high school in Warren, Texas, United States. It is part of the Warren Independent School District, which is located in southern Tyler County and extends into a small portion of northern Hardin County. The Principal is James Swinney with Brianne Dean serving as Assistant Principal.

Extracurricular Events

Athletics 
The Warren Warriors compete in the following sports-

Track & Field, Boys Basketball, Golf, Tennis, Softball, Baseball, Football, Girls Basketball, Cheerleading, Volleyball, & Cross Country. The Athletic Director is Austin Smithey.

FFA 
The Warren FFA Chapter is a member of the McGee Bend District of Area IX in the Texas FFA Association. The Warren FFA advisors are Rex Currie, Matt Swinney, and Jacob Spivey.

Band 
The "Pride of Warren" marching band performs at all football games and competes in marching contests. The Band Director is Russell Hopkins.

References

Public high schools in Texas
Education in Tyler County, Texas